Earl Lester "Buddy" Carlyle (born December 21, 1977) is an American former professional baseball pitcher and current coach. He has played in Major League Baseball (MLB) for the San Diego Padres, Los Angeles Dodgers, Atlanta Braves, New York Yankees and New York Mets. He also played for the LG Twins of the KBO League, and the Hanshin Tigers and Hokkaido Nippon-Ham Fighters of Nippon Professional Baseball (NPB).

Early years
Born in Omaha, Nebraska, Carlyle attended Bellevue East High School in Bellevue. In addition to baseball, he also lettered in basketball for the Chieftains and graduated in 1996.

Professional career

Cincinnati Reds and San Diego Padres
Originally selected by the Cincinnati Reds in the second round of the 1996 Major League Baseball draft, Carlyle spent two years in the Reds organization before being traded to the San Diego Padres for Marc Kroon on April 8, 1998. He played for the Mobile BayBears and Las Vegas Stars before making his major league debut on August 29, 1999. In his first year, he appeared in seven games, recording a 1–3 record and a 5.97 ERA while striking out 17 batters.

Hanshin Tigers
On November 3, the Padres sold Carlyle's contract to the Hanshin Tigers of Japan's Nippon Professional Baseball. In two seasons with Hanshin, Carlyle went 7–12 with a 4.29 ERA and 124 strikeouts.

Kansas City Royals
He was picked up by the Kansas City Royals as a free agent after the  season. He split the  season between the Double-A Wichita Wranglers and Triple-A Omaha Royals.

New York Yankees
He was granted free agency after the season and signed with the New York Yankees on December 23. Playing for Double-A Trenton and Triple-A Columbus, Carlyle compiled a 12–5 record with a 3.19 ERA and 140 strikeouts in 27 games played.

Los Angeles Dodgers
The Los Angeles Dodgers signed Carlyle for the 2005 season, and invited him to spring training. He began the season on the Dodgers roster, making his first big league appearance since 2000 on April 6. However, he was sent back down to the minors on May 6 and was briefly recalled at the end of May. An appendectomy in June derailed his comeback attempt, shelving him until the end of July, and he spent the rest of the season rehabbing in the minor leagues.

Florida Marlins
The Florida Marlins signed him on November 10, 2005. Carlyle began  with the Triple-A Albuquerque Isotopes, going 1–3 with a 1.93 ERA and 22 strikeouts in 13 games. He pitched well in April of that year, winning two games and losing none. He won his third game of the season on May 14, but, 4 days later on May 18, he was sold to the LG Twins in Seoul, Korea.

Atlanta Braves

On December 14, 2006, the Atlanta Braves invited Carlyle to spring training. He was reassigned to minor league camp on March 30, 2007, but after going 5–2 with a 2.59 ERA and 56 strikeouts in nine games for the Richmond Braves, he was called up to the big leagues on May 25. Carlyle made his Braves debut on May 26, 2007, in a game against the Philadelphia Phillies, a game in which he went four innings, surrendering five earned runs on six hits and allowing two walks. It was his first start in the major leagues since 1999. Carlyle earned his first win of the season and his first since 1999 on June 5, surrendering one hit, a solo home run to Aaron Boone of the Florida Marlins, while going seven innings.

On July 6, 2007, against the Padres, Carlyle tied his career-high with seven strikeouts, set a new career-high with eight innings pitched, and collected his first major league RBI which gave the Braves a 3–2 lead they would not relinquish. In the fourth inning of that game, Carlyle threw an immaculate inning by striking out the side on nine total pitches; it was the 40th time in major-league history that the feat had been accomplished. Reflecting on Carlyle's performance, then Braves manager Bobby Cox noted that "[Carlyle's] sneaky quick. A lot of guys don't have good hacks at him. He gets it by them." He finished his best season with an 8–7 record and a 5.21 ERA.

Carlyle started the 2008 season for the Triple-A Richmond Braves, but was promoted to Atlanta on April 15 with an injury to Peter Moylan. Carlyle ended the season with an ERA of 3.59 with 59 strikeouts in 45 games.

On October 9, 2009, Carlyle was outrighted to the Gwinnett Braves and he elected free agency.

Return to Japan
Carlyle pitched with the Hokkaido Nippon-Ham Fighters of Nippon Professional Baseball in 2010. Carlyle went 0–3 with a 4.88 ERA over 27.2 innings.

Return to the Yankees
Prior to the 2011 season, Carlyle signed a minor league contract with an invitation to spring training with the New York Yankees. He was promoted to the majors on April 22. He was designated for assignment on June 29, after pitching  innings for New York, recording a 4.70 ERA.  He was outrighted to the  AAA Scranton/Wilkes Barre Yankees on July 5. On August 18, he was released by the Yankees to make room for Raul Valdez on AAA Scranton/Wiles Barre's Roster.

Return to the Atlanta Braves
Before the 2012 season, Carlyle signed a minor league contract with the Atlanta Braves.

Toronto Blue Jays
On December 11, 2012, the Toronto Blue Jays announced that Carlyle had been signed to a minor league contract. Carlyle started the 2013 season with the Triple-A Buffalo Bisons.

New York Mets
Carlyle signed a minor league contract with the New York Mets for the 2014 season. He was called up to the Mets on May 31 and that same day pitched 3 innings against the Phillies in an extra-innings game, earning the win. He was designated for assignment on June 4. He was called back up on July 6, as Jon Niese was placed on the disabled list. When Niese returned on July 20, Carlyle was again designated for assignment. He was called up a third time on July 26, 2014. Carlyle finished the season 1-1, with a 1.45 ERA in 27 games. He agreed to another one-year minor league deal on January 5, 2015. Carlyle was placed on the disabled list with back and hamstring tightness on May 14, 2015. However, his season ended on July 12, 2015, when he got surgery to repair a labrum muscle in his hip. He finished the 2015 season 1–0, with a 5.63 ERA, 1.13 WHIP, six strikeouts, one walk, one save in 11 games in 8 innings pitched.

Carlyle once again signed a minor league deal with the Mets on December 14, 2015. He was released in March 2016.

Coaching career
The Atlanta Braves hired Carlyle in May 2016 to serve as a coaching assistant responsible for managing instant replay review. He is currently the pitching coach for the Rocket City Trash Pandas, the Double-A affiliate of the Los Angeles Angels.

Personal life
Carlyle was diagnosed with diabetes in 2009, and does multi-doses with an insulin pen.

References

External links

1977 births
Living people
Baseball players from Nebraska
Sportspeople from Omaha, Nebraska
Major League Baseball pitchers
San Diego Padres players
Hanshin Tigers players
Los Angeles Dodgers players
LG Twins players
Atlanta Braves players
Hokkaido Nippon-Ham Fighters players
New York Yankees players
New York Mets players
Texarkana Bulldogs baseball players
Princeton Reds players
Charleston AlleyCats players
Chattanooga Lookouts players
Mobile BayBears players
Las Vegas Stars (baseball) players
Wichita Wranglers players
Omaha Royals players
Trenton Thunder players
Columbus Clippers players
Gulf Coast Dodgers players
Las Vegas 51s players
Albuquerque Isotopes players
Richmond Braves players
Rome Braves players
Gwinnett Braves players
Scranton/Wilkes-Barre Yankees players
Buffalo Bisons (minor league) players
American expatriate baseball players in Japan
American expatriate baseball players in South Korea
KBO League pitchers
Toros del Este players
American expatriate baseball players in the Dominican Republic
Atlanta Braves coaches
Minor league baseball coaches
People from Bellevue, Nebraska
People from Sarpy County, Nebraska